Oreoglanis macronemus is a species of sisorid catfish. It is known only from four preserved specimens collected from the Xiangkhoang Plateau, northern Laos, by an expedition led by Jean Théodore Delacour in the mid-1920s and misidentified as Euchiloglanis sp. These specimens are in the Natural History Museum, London.

This is a very small catfish (the largest specimen, a male, has a standard length of ), generally smaller than most other Oreoglanis species (although the small sample size makes this distinction largely irrelevant). The main difference between this species and its congeners is its extremely long nasal barbels, almost half the length of the head.

References

Further reading
Ng, H. H. 2004.  Oreoglanis macronemus, a new species of glyptosternine catfish (Teleostei: Siluriformes: Sisoridae) from northern Laos. The Raffles Bulletin of Zoology, 52: 209-213.

macronemus
Taxa named by Heok Hee Ng
Fish described in 2004
Catfish of Asia
Fish of Laos
Endemic fauna of Laos